Ambalavolo is a rural commune located in the Atsinanana region of eastern Madagascar, and belongs to the Vatomandry (district).

The economy is based on agriculture, including coffee and cacao but also rice, mais and manioc are grown.

References

Cities in Madagascar
Populated places in Atsinanana